Anny Ondra (born Anna Sophie Ondráková; 15 May 1903 – 28 February 1987) was a Czech film actress. She began her career in 1920 and appeared in Czech, German, Austrian, French and English films. In 1933, she married German boxing champion Max Schmeling.

Life
Ondra was born in Tarnów to Czech parents, Bohumír Ondrák, an officer in the Austro-Hungarian Army, and Anna Ondráková (née Mracek). She had two brothers, Tomáš and Jindřich. She spent her childhood in Tarnów, Pula and Prague. At seventeen she acted in the theatre and in her first film, which was directed by her then boyfriend, director and actor Karel Lamač. When her family learned of it, they had a shouting match in which the teenager received a beating from her father - to be an actress, soon after the First World War, was socially almost at the level of being a beggar. Anna had been educated at a convent school and her father had found an official government position for her. Anna preferred a film career and began to live with Karel Lamač. "I swim like a fish, ride like a cowboy, and I would do it all if the film required it," summarised the nineteen-year-old.
After some years she wanted to start a family, but Lamač did not want to marry. So, after a three-year romance, on 6 July 1933 in Bad Saarow, Ondra married German boxer Max Schmeling. Schmeling had acquired the summer house in Bad Saarow belonging to the expressionist painter Bruno Krauskopf, who had fled exile from the Nazis, in 1933. Ondra and Schmeling appeared together in the film Knock-out (1935).

Throughout their marriage, the Nazi regime tried to exploit the fame and popularity of Ondra and Schmeling. They were often seen in photos with Joseph Goebbels and Adolf Hitler - Schmeling portrayed as a German superman (he was heavyweight champion of the world between 1930 and 1932) and Ondra as a blonde Aryan, despite her Slavic origins. However, they never collaborated: Schmeling refused to accept honours from the German state and even secretly helped to hide two Jewish children, saving their lives; in Nazi Germany this was a capital offence. After the war, they were penalised financially for collaboration, and an arrest warrant was issued in Czechoslovakia. Nazi propaganda was taken literally and Schmeling never visited Ondra's homeland.

After the war, they were left without funds and assets. In 1949 they moved to Hollenstedt near Hamburg, and in the 1950s Schmeling began working for The Coca-Cola Company.

Their marriage was a happy one, although childless: Ondra miscarried after a car accident in 1936, and it was to be her only pregnancy. Later, Ondra sponsored the granddaughter of her friend Hermann Gronen, born in 1942, who was married to Rosa Gronen (née Schmeling) in his first marriage. Max Schmeling gave the granddaughter Rosa Maria Gronen (today Winters) a pair of boxing gloves at her christening.

Ondra and Schmeling were married until her death in 1987. Lamač remained her friend throughout his lifetime. He died in her arms in 1952 in Hamburg.

Ondra was buried in the Saint Andreas Friedhof cemetery in Hollenstedt, West Germany. Schmeling died in 2005 and was buried next to her.

Film career
Her breakthrough was in the 1920 film Gilly in Prague for the First Time, and she acted in Czech and Austrian comedies in the 1920s. With the films Eve's Daughters (1928) and Sinful and Sweet (1929) she conquered the German market.

She also appeared in some British dramas, most notably Alfred Hitchcock's The Manxman and Blackmail (both 1929); in the latter, her character is the first “Hitchcock blonde". Blackmail was started as a silent film; in the course of production, however, it was decided to make it the first English sound film. A minute-long test film where Ondra speaks English has survived, in which Hitchcock teases her to get an emotional response by asking if she is a "bad woman" and if she slept with men, making her laugh out of embarrassment. Ondra's accent was considered unacceptable, but Hitchcock didn't want to do without her as an actress, so he had her part dubbed by British actress Joan Barry. Barry thus became the first voice actress and Anny Ondra the first foreign-language dubbed actress in film history, the dubbing taking place in an unusual way: Ondra moved her lips, Barry spoke the text outside the picture.

After returning to Germany, Ondra formed the production company Ondra-Lamač-Films with Karel Lamač, which lasted until 1936. Lamač directed her in several silent films, acted with her in films directed by other filmmakers, and continued to work together after her marriage to Max Schmeling. She played her first self-spoken sound film role alongside Sig Arno in Fairground People (1930).

Ondra made some forty more films in the sound era, the last in 1957, and in total over 90 films.

Ondra was portrayed by Britt Ekland in the television movie Ring of Passion (1978), wherein the character was named Amy Ondra Schmeling. She was also portrayed by Peta Wilson in the docudrama Joe and Max (2002) and by Susanne Wuest in Max Schmeling (2010).

Selected filmography

Awards
She was given the Honorary German Film Award in 1970.

References

Bibliography

External links

 
 
 Virtual History - Tobacco Cards of Ondra
 
 Max Schmeling foundation - Max-Schmeling-Stiftung
 Max Schmeling - film on Internet Movie Database
 

1903 births
1987 deaths
People from Tarnów
Czechoslovak film actresses
Czech film actresses
Czech silent film actresses
20th-century Czech actresses
Czech expatriates in Germany